The men's 500 metres races of the 2015–16 ISU Speed Skating World Cup 5, arranged in the Sørmarka Arena in Stavanger, Norway, were held on 29 and 31 January 2016.

Pavel Kulizhnikov of Russia won race one, while compatriot Ruslan Murashov came second, and Kai Verbij of the Netherlands came third. Kim Tae-yun of South Korea won the first Division B race.

Kulizhnikov and Murashov also took the top two places in race two, while Gilmore Junio of Canada finished in third place. Gao Tingyu of China won the second Division B race.

Race 1
Race one took place on Friday, 29 January, with Division B scheduled in the morning session, at 10:59, and Division A scheduled in the afternoon session, at 16:25.

Division A

Division B

Race 2
Race two took place on Sunday, 31 January, with Division B scheduled in the morning session, at 09:45, and Division A scheduled in the afternoon session, at 14:30.

Division A

Division B

References

Men 0500
5